The Rural Municipality of Maple Creek No. 111 is a rural municipality (RM) in the Canadian province of Saskatchewan within Census Division No. 4 and  Division No. 3. It is located in the southwest portion of the province.

History 
The RM of Maple Creek No. 111 incorporated as a rural municipality on December 10, 1917.

Geography

Communities and localities 
The following urban municipalities are surrounded by the RM.

Towns
 Maple Creek

The following unincorporated communities are within the RM.

Localities
 Belanger
 Cardell
 Clearsite
 Cummings
 Hatton, dissolved as a village, March 15, 1934
 Kincorth
 Mackid

It is adjacent to the Indian reserve of the Nekaneet Cree Nation.

Demographics 

Economy 
Its main industry is ranching.

Government 
The RM of Maple Creek No. 111 is governed by an elected municipal council and an appointed administrator that meets on the second Thursday of every month. The reeve of the RM is Walter Ehret while its administrator is Christine Hoffman. The RM's office is located in Maple Creek.

References 

M

Division No. 4, Saskatchewan